Stefán Karel Torfason (born 20 April 1994) is an Icelandic strongman competitor and a former basketball player. Stefán became the Iceland's Strongest Man in 2021, standing 203 cm (6'8") and weighing 150 kg (331 lbs). Prior to his strongman career, he was a standout basketball player and a member of the Icelandic national basketball team.

Biography
Stefán was born in Akureyri, Iceland on 20 April 1994. His father is Torfi Ólafsson a former Icelandic strongman.

Basketball career

Club career
Stefán began at early age competing in basketball for his local club Þór Akureyri. Stefán joined Snæfell in Stykkishólmur in 2010 and ÍR in 2016. He was forced to retire from basketball in 2016 after his fourth concussion on doctors recommendation.

National team career
In 2013, Stefán played 5 games for the Icelandic national basketball team.

Strongman career

Following his retirement from basketball, Stefán focused afterwards to become a strongman like his father. In 2021 Stefán became Iceland's Strongest man.

References

External links
Basketball statistics at Icelandic Basketball Association

1994 births
Living people
Stefan Karel Torfason
Icelandic strength athletes
Icelandic powerlifters
Stefan Karel Torfason
Stefan Karel Torfason
Stefan Karel Torfason
Stefan Karel Torfason